Chondrocidaris gigantea is a species of sea urchin of the family Cidaridae. Their armour is covered with spines. Chondrocidaris gigantea was first scientifically described in 1863 by Alexander Agassiz.

References 

Animals described in 1863
Cidaridae
Taxa named by Alexander Agassiz